Deray is both a given name and a surname. Notable people with the name include:
DeRay Davis (born 1982), American stand-up comedian and actor
DeRay Mckesson (born 1985), American civil rights activist
Jacques Deray (1929–2003), French film director and screenwriter